Julie may refer to:

 Julie (given name), a list of people and fictional characters with the name

Film and television
 Julie (1956 film), an American film noir starring Doris Day
 Julie (1975 film), a Hindi film by K. S. Sethumadhavan featuring Lakshmi
 Julie (1998 film), a British public information film about seatbelt use
 Julie (2004 film), a Hindi film starring Neha Dhupia
 Julie (2006 film), a Kannada film starring Ramya
 Julie (TV series), a 1992 American sitcom starring Julie Andrews

Literature
 Julie; or, The New Heloise, a 1761 novel by Jean-Jacques Rousseau
 Julie (George novel), a 1994 novel, the second book of a trilogy, by Jean Craighead George
 Julie, a 1985 novel by Cora Taylor

Music
 Julie (opera), a 2005 opera by Philippe Boesmans

Albums
 Julie (album), by Julie London, 1957
 Julie (EP) or the title song, by Jens Lekman, 2004

Songs
 "Julie", by Doris Day, 1956
 "Julie" (Daniel song), by Daniel from Julie, 1983
 "Julie", by David Bowie, the B-side of "Day-In Day-Out", 1987
 "Julie", by Levellers from Levellers, 1993
 "Julie", by Damian Marley from Mr. Marley, 1996
 "Julie", by Prism from Prism, 1977
 "Julie", by Take That from The Circus, 2008
 "Julie", by Ali Zafar, 2017

Other uses
 Julie (mango), a mango cultivar
 Julidochromis or julies, a genus of cichlid fish
 Julie, an interactive doll created by Worlds of Wonder

See also 
 
 Jules, a given name
 Juli (disambiguation)
 Julia (disambiguation)
 Julien (disambiguation)
 Juliette (disambiguation)
 July (disambiguation)
 Miss Julie (disambiguation)
 Yulia, a given name